Are You a Rebel? is the debut studio album by a Polish thrash metal band Acid Drinkers. It is also the first album by a polish metal band to be released on CD. The recording lasted for 13 days and was done in Studio Giełda, Poznań.
The first release of the album was made by an English label Under One Flag Records, and wasn't distributed in Poland until April 1991, when Polskie Nagrania "Muza" decided to put it out.

The first track on Are You a Rebel? is one of the oldest songs created by the band. Its lyrics are about Titus's friend from Army. The album is also full of band's typical humour, a great example of which is the song Woman with the Dirty Feet. Nevertheless, the most well known tracks from this release are definitely Barmy Army, I Am the Mystic and I Fuck the Violence which are played live even to these days.

Track listing

Bonus tracks

Personnel 
 Tomasz "Titus" Pukacki – vocals, bass
 Robert "Litza" Friedrich – backing vocals, guitar
 Dariusz "Popcorn" Popowicz – guitar
 Maciej "Ślimak" Starosta – drums
 Music – Acid Drinkers
 Engineered – Piotr Madziar
 Kompas – vocal on track 8

Release history 

Acid Drinkers albums
1990 debut albums